The High Sheriff of Cavan was the British Crown's judicial representative in County Cavan, Ireland from the 16th century until 1922, when the office was abolished in the new Free State and replaced by the office of Cavan County Sheriff. The sheriff had judicial, electoral, ceremonial and administrative functions and executed High Court Writs. In 1908, an Order in Council made the Lord-Lieutenant the Sovereign's prime representative in a county and reduced the High Sheriff's precedence. However the sheriff retained his responsibilities for the preservation of law and order in the county. The usual procedure for appointing the sheriff from 1660 onwards was that three persons were nominated at the beginning of each year from the county and the Lord Lieutenant then appointed one of the nominees as his choice of High Sheriff for the remainder of the year. Often the other nominees were appointed as under-sheriffs. Sometimes a sheriff did not fulfil his entire term through death or other event and another sheriff was then appointed for the remainder of the year. The dates given hereunder are the dates of appointment.  All addresses are in County Cavan unless stated otherwise.

Elizabeth I, 1558–1603
1581: Eamon O'Reilly of Kilnacrott (later Lord of Bréifne O'Reilly 1596–1601)
1584: Sir Henry Duke
1585: Sir Henry Duke
1586: Sir Henry Duke
1587: Sir Henry Duke
1588: Sir Henry Duke
1589: Sir Edward Herbert
1590: Sir Edward Herbert
1591: Sir Edward Herbert
1592: Sir Edward Herbert
1593: Sir Edward Herbert
1594: Sir Edward Herbert
1595: Sir Edward Herbert
1596: Sir Edward Herbert
1597: Sir Edward Herbert
1598: Sir Edward Herbert
1599: Sir Edward Herbert
1600: Sir Edward Herbert
1601: Sir Edward Herbert
1602: Sir Edward Herbert
1603: Sir Edward Herbert

James I, 1603–1625
1604: Sir Edward Herbert
1605: Sir Edward Herbert
1606: Sir Edward Herbert
1607: Hugh Culme
1608: Sir Edward Herbert
1609: Sir Edward Herbert
1610: Sir Edward Herbert
1611: Hugh Culme
1612: Hugh Culme
1613: John Ridgeway
1614: John Butler
1615: James Craig
1616: John Fish
1617: Nicholas Lisle
1618: Hugh Culme
1619: Richard Lisle
1620: Robert Scurlock
1621: Robert Scurlock
1622: Sir Stephen Butler of Belturbet

Charles I, 1625–1649
1629: Philip O'Reilly
1630: Thomas Fleming
1634: John Fleming
1635: Thomas Fleming
1636: James Fleming of Ballyneagh
1638: Edward Gray
1639: William Lill
1640: Francis Lawrence Devall
1641: Myles (Mulmory) O'Reilly of Kevit Castle, Kilmore
1641: James Talbot of Ballyconnell Castle, Ballyconnell
(When the 1641 Rebellion broke out in Ireland in October 1641, the English government terminated Myles O'Reilly's reign as sheriff due to his involvement as one of the Irish Rebel leaders, but he continued in the role in those parts of Cavan which were under native Irish rule until the surrender of the Cavan rebels on 27 April 1653. James Talbot was appointed in October 1641 as the new High Sheriff by the Dublin Lord Justices but soon left Cavan in fear for his life so in effect there were two opposing High Sheriffs of Cavan for the period of the Rebellion. Before the Rebellion, Cavan High Sheriffs were mostly Catholics but after the Rebellion they were almost all Protestant landlords)
2 May 1642 The Dublin Government appointed Edward Philpott

Commonwealth, 1649–1660

Dec 1655: Charles Coote
12 Nov 1656: Robert Saunderson of Castle Saunderson, Belturbet
1 Dec 1658: Edward Philpott

Charles II, 1660–1685

1660: Humphrey Perrott of Drumhone
1661: Humphrey Perrott of Drumhone
1662: Thomas White of Redhills
26 Feb 1663: Richard Blayney
28 Nov 1663: Samuel Townley
31 Dec 1664: Thomas Couch
1666: Edward Philpott
1667: Robert Saunderson of Castle Saunderson, Belturbet
1668: Ambrose Bedell of Carn, Kildallan
4 Dec 1668: Thomas Gwyllym of Ballyconnell Castle, Ballyconnell
24 Nov 1669: Hugh Culme
1671: Abraham Clements of Rathkenny
22 Dec 1671: Richard Lewis of Lismore
12 Dec 1672: Nicholas Kempston of Dunmurray
22 Jan 1674: Daniel Clements of Rathkenny
17 Dec 1674: John Maxwell
9 Dec 1675: Thomas Newburgh
21 Dec 1676: Matthew French of Belturbet
22 Nov 1677: John Coyne
9 Jan 1679: James Sanderson
4 Dec 1679: Henry Palmer of Ballymagauran
13 Jan 1681: Humphrey Perrott of Castle Bagshaw
12 Dec 1681: William Lowther
11 Dec 1682: Fergus Farrell
25 Jan 1684: Robert Casey
6 Dec 1684: Thomas Couch

James II, 1685–1688
(When King James II was crowned he began to appoint Cavan Catholics as High Sheriff but this ceased with his defeat by King William III, who then recommenced the appointment of Protestant landlords)

28 Jan 1686: Samuel Townley of Drumrooske
17 Feb 1687: Lucas Reilly
10 Nov 1687: Edward Reilly
16 Nov 1688: Luke Reilly (until William III took power and appointed Henry Gwyllym of Ballyconnell sheriff)

William and Mary, 1689–1694

7 Aug 1690: Daniel French of Belturbet
10 Dec 1690: Francis White of Redhills
1691: Francis White of Redhills
1693: Arnold Cosby of Lismore
7 Dec 1693: Robert Clements of Rathkenny
20 Dec 1694: Thomas Coote

William III, 1694–1702

24 Dec 1695: James Kennedy
3 Dec 1696: Thomas Townley of Thomascourt, Drumrooske
12 Dec 1697: Charles Hampson of Aghacreevy
3 Feb 1699: William Blachford of Lisanover, Templeport
25 Nov 1699: John Kempson
22 Nov 1700: Edward Cosby of Skea
4 Dec 1701: Henry Joseph Pratt

Anne, 1702–1714

21 Nov 1702: Brinsley Butler
26 Nov 1703: Thomas Fleming Junior of Belville, Crossdoney
14 Dec 1704: Brockhill Newburgh of Ballyhaise
23 Nov 1705: William Fitzherbert
12 Nov 1706: Charles Townley
14 Nov 1707: Charles Mortimer of Lislin
25 Nov 1708: William Nesbitt
24 Nov 1709: Henry Grattan
3 Dec 1710: Edward Cosby
27 Dec 1711: Thomas White
16 Dec 1712: William Fitzherbert
1714: Alexander Saunderson

George I, 1714–1727

1715: Charles Hampson
19 Jan 1716: Samuel Madden
2 Dec 1716: James Moore
1718: Arnold Cosby of Lismore
1719: Henry Newburgh
7 Dec 1719: Charles Coote of Coote Hill
Nov 1720: Thomas Nesbitt of Lismore
16 Dec 1720: Charles Betty of Farranseer
11 Dec 1721: Mervyn Pratt of Cabra Castle, Kingscourt
24 Jan 1723: Arthur Galbraith
29 Nov 1723: William Berry
15 Nov 1724: Charles Coote
10 Dec 1725: Theophilus Clements of Rathkenny
14 Dec 1726: Humphrey Butler of Belturbet

George II, 1727–1760

24 Jan 1728: Thomas Burrowes of Stradone
14 Dec 1728: John Stephens of Ballinacargy
21 Jan 1730: John Jones Junior of Belturbet
15 Dec 1730: Nathaniel Clements
6 Jan 1732: James Saunderson of Drumcassidy, Cloverhill
20 Dec 1732: Thomas Davenport of Cullintragh
27 Jan 1733: Brockhill Perrott of Castle Bagshaw
31 Jan 1734: John Stanford of Carn, Kildallan
14 Feb 1735: Balthazar John Cramer
19 Feb 1736: Benjamin Copeland
21 Jan 1737: Galbraith Holmes
7 Mar 1738: John Enery of Bawnboy House
12 Jan 1739: John Maxwell of Farnham, Cavan
5 Mar 1740: Francis Saunderson
3 Feb 1741: Francis White of Redhills
4 Feb 1742: Thomas Newburgh of Ballyhaise
9 Mar 1743: Thomas Burrowes of Stradone House, Stradone
23 Feb 1744: Samuel Moore
15 Feb 1745: Simon Davenport of Cullintragh
13 Mar 1746: Josiah Veaitch of Drumurry
1 Feb 1747: Arthur Ellis of Ballyheady
4 Mar 1748: William Newburgh of Drumcarne
22 Jan 1749: William Stewart of Bailieborough
3 Mar 1750: Martin Armstrong of Carrickmakeegan, Drumreilly, Co. Leitrim
12 Jan 1751: Joseph Tuite of Orange-Brooke
24 Dec 1751: George Montgomery (MP) of Ballyconnell House, Ballyconnell
3 Feb 1753: Nicholas Coyne of Clonoose
22 Feb 1754: James Moore of Tullyvin
15 Dec 1754: Brinsley Butler
19 Feb 1756: John Cramer of Belturbet
29 Jan 1757: Robert Maxwell of Farnham
28 Jan 1758: Alexander Saunderson of Castle Saunderson, Belturbet
9 Feb 1759: John Enery of Bawnboy House, Bawnboy
7 Feb 1760: Charles Coote of Cootehill

George III, 1760–1820

19 Feb 1761: Archibald Acheson, 1st Viscount Gosford of Market Hill, Co. Armagh
29 Jan 1762: Robert Nugent of Bobsgrove, Mountnugent
24 Feb 1763: David Jones of Belturbet
10 Feb 1764: Cosby Nesbitt of Lismore
8 Mar 1765: Thomas Cosby of Bailieborough
3 Mar 1766: Henry Theophilus Clements of Ashfield Lodge, Rathkenny, Cootehill
26 Feb 1767: James Young of Lahard
12 Feb 1768: Bedell Stanford of Carn, Kildallan
31 Dec 1768: Thomas Nesbitt of Lismore
15 Feb 1770: James Fleming of Belville, Crossdoney
28 Dec 1770: Thomas Fleming of Cavan
28 Jan 1772: Gore Ellis of Ballyheady
5 Feb 1773: Robert Burrowes of Stradone House, Stradone
17 Feb 1774: Wiliam Stanford of Bilberry Hill, Kildallan
21 Jun 1774: Henry Theophilus Clements of Ashfield
17 Feb 1775: Alexander Saunderson of Drumcassidy, Cloverhill
6 Feb 1776: John Baker of Ashgrove
2 Feb 1777: Humphrey Nixon of Nixon Lodge, Belturbet
18 Feb 1778: John Hassard of Ennismore
1779: William Perrott Newburgh of Ballyhaise
12 Feb 1780: William Moore of Tullyvin
4 Feb 1781: Francis Saunderson of Castle Saunderson, Belturbet
21 Feb 1782: James Pratt
9 Feb 1783: Richard Adams of Shercock House, Shercock
19 Feb 1784: Francis Whyte of Redhills
25 Feb 1785: John Moutray Jones of Belturbet
20 Feb 1786: Robert Sanderson of Drumkeen
20 Feb 1787: Anthony O'Reilly of Baltrasna, County Meath
23 Feb 1788: Oliver Nugent of Bobsgrove, Mountnugent
19 Feb 1789: John Stanford of Carn, Kildallan
18 Feb 1790: Stewart Adams of Annally
9 Feb 1791: Sir Robert Hodson, 1st Baronet of Skea
27 Feb 1792: Broghill Newburgh of Ballyhaise
18 Feb 1793: William Henry Stephens of Ballinacargy
9 Feb 1794: Thomas Fleming of Castle Cosby
9 Jan 1795: Nathaniel Sneyd of Ballyconnell
18 Feb 1796: John Enery, Junior of Bawnboy
10 Mar 1797: Christopher Bredin of Rice Hill
5 Mar 1798: Cosby Nesbitt of Lismore
22 Feb 1799: Joseph Pratt of Cabra Castle, Kingscourt
14 Mar 1800: James Saunderson of Drumcassidy, Cloverhill
16 Feb 1801: Robert Kellett of Glebe, Waterstown, Moynalty, Co. Meath
27 Feb 1802: John Baker of Ashgrove
22 Feb 1803: Thomas Burrowes of Stradone House
23 Feb 1804: James O'Reilly of Baltrasna, Co. Meath
5 Feb 1805: Samuel Moore
14 Feb 1806: Andrew Bell of Drum Hill
11 Feb 1807: John Bell of Bellsgrove, Aghnacreevy
24 April 1807: Charles Coote of Bellamont Forest, Cootehill
28 Feb 1808: Robert Saunderson of Drumkeen
17 Feb 1809: Luke Magrath of Lakeville House, Gartinardress townland, Killeshandra
5 Feb 1810: James Adams of Drum Lodge
11 Feb 1811: John Adams of Shinan, Shercock
12 Feb 1812: Perrott Thornton of Greenville, Kildallan
20 Feb 1813: Henry Gore Sankey of Fort Frederick, Virginia
12 Feb 1814: Henry John Clements of Ashfield Lodge
20 Feb 1815: Richard Brady Blackwood of Clonervy
20 Feb 1816: Cosby Young of Lahard, Killeshandra
4 Feb 1817: Robert Henry Southwell of Castle Hamilton
19 Feb 1818: Alexander Saunderson of Castle Saunderson, Belturbet
1819: Sneyd Sankey of Fort Frederick, Virginia

George IV, 1820–1830

12 Feb 1820: William Young of Bailieborough Castle, Bailieborough
15 Feb 1821: Christopher Edmund Nugent of Bobsgrove, Mountnugent
6 Feb 1822: William Humphreys of Ballyhaise
4 Mar 1823: James Hamilton Storey of Ballyconnell House, Ballyconnell
6 Mar 1824: John Hassard of Bawnboy
7 Feb 1825: Bedell Stanford of Carn Cottage, Kildallan
8 Feb 1826: Ralph Bell Clarke of Drumkeel, Cavan
15 Feb 1827: Maxwell James Boyle of Tullyvin House, Cootehill
Feb 1828: Andrew Bell of Lossett, Cavan
3 Mar 1829: Theophilus Lucas Clements of Rathkenny, Cootehill
23 Feb 1830: Charles Car Morton of Kilnarook (Grandson of Doctor Charles Morton of The British Museum)

William IV, 1830–1837

8 Feb 1831: George Marshall Knipe of Erne Hill, Belturbet
17 Feb 1832: William Humphreys, Junior of Ballyhaise Castle
20 Jan 1833: Charles James Adams of Shinan House, Shercock
13 Feb 1834: William Rathborne of Kilcogy
1 Feb 1835: John Finlay of Brackley Lodge, Bawnboy
12 Feb 1836: Sir Thomas Finlay of Bawnboy House, Bawnboy
11 Feb 1837: Gerald Dease of Castlepollard, Co. Westmeath

Victoria, 1837–1901

3 Mar 1838: Robert Burrowes of Stradone House, Stradone
1 Feb 1839: Sir George Frederick John Hodson, 3rd Baronet of Hollybrook, Bray, Co. Wicklow
14 Feb 1840: John Nesbitt of Lismore Lodge, Crossdoney
7 Feb 1841: Mervyn Pratt of Cabra Castle, Kingscourt
11 Feb 1842: Robert Saunderson of Castle Saunderson, Belturbet
1 Feb 1843: William Hamilton Enery of Ballyconnell House, Ballyconnell
7 Feb 1844: Somerset Maxwell, 8th Baron Farnham of Arley Cottage, Mountnugent
31 Jan 1845: Anthony O'Reilly of Baltrasna, Co. Meath
3 Feb 1846: Thomas Taylour, 3rd Marquess of Headfort of Headford House, Kells, County Meath
30 Jan 1847: James Hamilton of Castle Hamilton, Killeshandra
8 Feb 1848: Richard Fox of White Park, Killeshandra
26 Jan 1849: Henry Theophilus Clements of Ashfield Lodge, Cootehill
1 Feb 1850: Henry Cavendish Butler of Lanesborough Lodge, Belturbet
4 Feb 1851: Henry Bevan Slator of White Hill, Edgeworthstown, Co. Longford
30 Jan 1852: Samuel Winter of Agher House, Summerhill, Co. Meath
28 Jan 1853: Joseph Storey of Bingfield
28 Jan 1854: John Harvey Adams of Northlands, Kingscourt
13 Jan 1855: Edward Rotheram of Crossdrum, Oldcastle, Co. Meath
30 Jan 1856: Robert John Cuming of Crover, Mountnugent
15 Jan 1857: Theophilus Henry Clements of Rakenny, Tullyvin
19 Jan 1858: James Arthur Dease of Turbotstown, Castlepollard, Co. Westmeath
1 Feb 1859: Edward James Saunderson of Castle Saunderson, Belturbet
20 Jan 1860: James Story of Ture, Belturbet
16 Jan 1861: Matthew O'Reilly Dease of Dee Farm, Dunleer, Co. Louth
20 Jan 1862: Alexander Nesbitt of Lismore
10 Jan 1863: Nathaniel Montgomery of Cullies, Cavan
9 Jan 1864: John Edward Vernon of Erne Hill, Belturbet
14 Jan 1865: George de la Poer Beresford of Aubawn, Killeshandra
14 Jan 1866: Benjamin Samuel Adams of Shinan House, Shercock
13 Jan 1867: Henry Sydenham Singleton of Hazeley Heath, Hampshire, England
15 Jan 1868: Richard Coote of Bellamont Forest, Cootehill
23 Jan 1869: Llewellyn Traherne Bassett Saunderson of Drumkeen House, Cavan
22 Jan 1870: Edmond Robert Nugent of Bobsgrove, Mountnugent
1 Feb 1871: James Saunderson Winter of Agher, Enfield, Co. Meath
31 Jan 1872: Robert Erskine of Erskine House, Cavan
21 Jan 1873: John Fay of Moynehall, Cavan
20 Jan 1874: Alexander J. William Sankey of Fort Frederick, Virginia
19 Jan 1875: William Leslie of Cootehill
21 Jan 1876: Samuel Saunderson of Cloverhill, Belturbet
19 Jan 1877: William Humphreys of Ballyhaise House, Ballyhaise
18 Apr 1877: Somerset Henry Maxwell of Arley Cottage, Mountnugent
19 Jan 1878: Edward Smith of Bellamont Forest, Cootehill
19 Jan 1879: John Winter Humphreys of Ballyhaise House, Ballyhaise
22 Jan 1880: Charles George Henry Coote of Mortimer House, Mortimer, Berkshire, England
23 Feb 1881: James Henry Fay of Faybrook, Cootehill
25 Jan 1882: William Henry Moutray Leslie of Castletown House, Bailieborough
27 Jan 1883: Robert James Burrowes of Stradone House, Stradone
23 Jan 1884: John Joseph Benison of Slieve Russell House, Ballyconnell
24 Jan 1885: Charles Brinsley Marlay of Belvedere House, Mullingar, Co. Westmeath
23 Jan 1886: William Joseph Hamilton of Drummany House, Killeshandra
26 Jan 1887: William Adams of Drumelton House, Cootehill
24 Jan 1888: Thomas Cosby Burrowes of Lismore House, Crossdoney
17 Jan 1889: Sir Robert Adair Hodson, 4th Baronet of Hollybrook House, Bray, Co. Wicklow
21 Jan 1890: Fane Vernon of Erne Hill, Belturbet
19 Feb 1891: Henry John Beresford Clements of Ashfield lodge, Cootehill
18 Feb 1892: Samuel Black Roe of Ballyconnell House, Ballyconnell
31 Jan 1893: Thomas Gerrard of Gibbstown, Navan, County Meath
23 Jan 1894: Joseph Pratt of Cabra Castle, Kingscourt
22 Jan 1895: John Rolland Singleton of Hazeley Heath, Winchfield, Hampshire, England
18 Feb 1896: James Hugh Moore-Garrett of Corriewood, Castlewellan, Co. Down.
12 Jan 1897: Edward Patrick Smith of Bellamont Forest, Cootehill.
20 Feb 1898: Edward Smith of Bellamont Forest, Cootehill.
19 Jan 1899: Gerald Dease of Turbotstown, Coole, Co. Westmeath.
16 Jan 1900: Sir Henry Cochrane of Woodbrook, Bray, Co. Wicklow.
18 Jan 1901: Edward Shaw Tener of Kilnahard, Mountnugent.

Edward VII, 1901–1910

14 Jan 1902: Thomas James Burrowes of Stradone House, Stradone
16 Jan 1903: Austen Morgan Rotherham of Crossdrum, Oldcastle, Co. Meath
9 Jan 1904: Robert Cecil Richard Clifford of Carn Cottage, Kildallan
14 Jan 1905: Theophilus Edward Lucas Clements of Rathkenny, Cootehill
3 Jan 1906: Edward Beresford of Aubawn, Killeshandra
12 Jan 1907: Somerset Saunderson of Castle Saunderson, Belturbet
8 Jan 1908: Edmond O'Connor of Charleville, Dunleer, Co. Louth
5 Jan 1909: Robert Story of Mount Salus, Dalkey, Co. Dublin
22 Dec 1909: Henry Edward Maxwell of Arley, Mountnugent

George V 1910–1936

6 Jan 1911: Frederick Paul Smith of Kevitt Castle, Crossdoney.
31 Dec 1911: Edward William Fleming of 25 Grimston Avenue, Folkestone, England.
1 Jan 1913: Richard Jones Sankey of 63 Merrion Square, Dublin, Co. Dublin.
1914: Joseph Maxwell Greene of Tullyvin House, Cootehill.
1915: Major John James Pardon of Cloverhill, Belturbet & Clondriss, Killucan, County Westmeath.
1916: Colonel Edward A.H. Roe of Ballyconnell House, Ballyconnell.
1917: Joseph Arnold Arthur Benison of Slieve Russell House, Ballyconnell.
1918: Thomas Cosby Burrowes of Lismore Lodge, Crossdoney.
1919: Thomas J. Burrowes of Stradone House, Cavan.
1920: Edward Patrick Dorman-Smith of Bellamont House, Cootehill.
1921: Major Mervyn Pratt of Cabra Castle, Kingscourt.

References

Patentee Officers in Ireland 1173–1826, Ed. James L. Hughes
Ulster Journal of Archaeology 1896 pp. 143–145
Liber Munorum Publicorum Hiberniae 1152–1827
The Ulster Plantation in the Counties of Armagh and Cavan 1608-41, R.J. Hunter, 2012, P. 419.
Thom's Official Directory, all years to 1921

 
Cavan
History of County Cavan